Crevi (also Mitchells Cross Roads) is a ghost town in Tallahatchie County, Mississippi, United States.

In 1876, the United States government established a postal road between Crevi and Friars Point, Mississippi.

Crevi had a post office, and in 1900, a population of 21.

References

Former populated places in Tallahatchie County, Mississippi
Former populated places in Mississippi